Morinda Junction railway station (station code:- MRND) is in Rupnagar district of Punjab state. It is fall under Northern Railway zone's Ambala railway division. It is single line electrified.

The Morinda railway station is located on Morinda city road (Connecting Chandigarh and Ludhiana). This benefits local businesses, enabling the town development and expansion. Today, Morinda grows at a faster rate than its neighbouring towns. A lot of industries of nearby towns.

References

Railway stations in Rupnagar district
Ambala railway division